"Hot Pants (She Got to Use What She Got to Get What She Wants)" is a funk song by James Brown. Brown recorded the song in 1971 and released it that year as a three-part single on his People Records label, which was then distributed by his primary label King. It was a number-one R&B hit and reached number fifteen on the Billboard Hot 100 pop chart in the U.S. along with reaching number ten on the Cashbox magazine charts. "Hot Pants" was Brown's final release under King's purview before he (and the People label) moved to Polydor Records. The song's lyrics are an ode to the captivating power of the title garment, which members of the band first saw on their 1970 European tour.

Like much of Brown's funk repertoire, "Hot Pants" has been extensively sampled in hip hop productions.

Personnel
James Brown - lead vocal

with the J.B.'s:
 Fred Wesley - trombone
 Jimmy Parker - alto saxophone
 St. Clair Pinckney - tenor saxophone
 Bobby Byrd - organ
 Hearlon "Cheese" Martin - guitar
 Robert Lee Coleman - guitar
 Fred Thomas - bass
 John "Jabo" Starks - drums
 Johnny Griggs - congas

Other versions and related songs
Soon after moving to Polydor, Brown re-recorded "Hot Pants" for inclusion on the Hot Pants album to be released on his new label. The 8:42 long album version, which was never released as a single, was recorded on July 12, 1971, at Rodel Studios, Washington, D.C. with the same personnel as the previous recording. It was included on the 1986 compilation album In the Jungle Groove.

Several of Brown's associates also recorded Hot Pants-themed songs. Bobby Byrd recorded "Hot Pants - I'm Coming, I'm Coming, I'm Coming", released on Brownstone Records in 1972. This version of the song was also frequently sampled for its drum loop. Notable sampling songs include "Fight The Power" by Public Enemy, "Fools Gold" by The Stone Roses, "Papua New Guinea" by Future Sound of London, "Step Back In Time" by Kylie Minogue and "Good Vibrations" by Marky Mark and the Funky Bunch. The song was featured on the Grand Theft Auto: San Andreas soundtrack on the Master Sounds 98.3 station. Byrd's wife Vicki Anderson also recorded an answer song, "I'm Too Tough For Mr. Big Stuff (Hot Pants)", for Brownstone. The J.B.'s recorded the instrumental "Hot Pants Road" as the B-side of their 1971 hit "Pass the Peas".

James Brown's 1998 release "Funk on Ah Roll" reuses/resamples the guitar and horn parts of "Hot Pants".

References

External links
 Song Review at Allmusic
 List of songs that sample "Hot Pants"

James Brown songs
1971 singles
Songs written by James Brown
Songs written by Fred Wesley
Sampled drum breaks
1971 songs